Luís Felipe Oyama (born 30 January 1997) is a Brazilian footballer who plays as a midfielder for RWD Molenbeek on loan from Botafogo. He is of Japanese descent.

Club career
Oyama was born in São José do Rio Preto, São Paulo, and joined Mirassol's youth setup in 2013, after spending some time playing tennis. He made his first team debut on 24 July 2015, coming on as a second-half substitute in a 1–1 home draw against Rio Preto, for the year's Copa Paulista.

Oyama scored his first senior goal on 30 August 2017, netting the opener in a 2–2 away draw against XV de Piracicaba, also for the state cup. Sparingly used, he was loaned to Atibaia in February 2019.

After returning from loan from Atibaia, Oyama was regularly used in the 2020 Campeonato Paulista, as his side reached the semifinals of the competition. On 6 July 2020, he joined Série B side Ponte Preta on loan until the end of the campaign.

Career statistics

Honours
Botafogo
Campeonato Brasileiro Série B: 2021

References

External links
Ponte Preta profile 

1997 births
Living people
People from São José do Rio Preto
Brazilian footballers
Brazilian people of Japanese descent
Association football midfielders
Campeonato Brasileiro Série A players
Campeonato Brasileiro Série B players
Campeonato Brasileiro Série D players
Mirassol Futebol Clube players
Sport Club Atibaia players
Associação Atlética Ponte Preta players
Botafogo de Futebol e Regatas players
Footballers from São Paulo (state)